The Tinja is a river of northeastern Bosnia and Herzegovina. It is a right tributary of the Sava, into which it flows near Brčko.

References

Rivers of Bosnia and Herzegovina